Mauro Briano (born 8 March 1975 in Carmagnola, Piedmont) is an Italian footballer who plays for Seconda Divisione club Savona. He spent most of his career at Serie B and Serie C1 (now Lega Pro Prima Divisione).

Biography
Born in Carmagnola, the Province of Turin, Briano started his career at Torino and played his first Serie A match on 23 April 1995 against A.C. Milan.

He then left for Gualdo of Serie C1 and played for 3 seasons. In 1998, he was signed by Reggina Calcio (Serie B) and won promotion to Serie A. In 1999, he left for Serie B newcomer Savoia in co-ownership deal, but bought back by Reggina after Savoia relegated in June 2000. He then spent a season at Serie B struggler Monza and faced another relegation. In 2001, he first left for Cosenza then left for Lecco of Serie C1 in co-ownership deal. In 2002, he returned to Gualdo and played a season at Serie C2. In 2003, he left for Catanzaro of Serie C1 where he won the champion. In mid of Serie B 2004–05 he left for league rival Triestina.

In 2007-08 season, he played for Serie C1 side Lucchese and in next season for Alessandria.

In August 2010, he left for newly promoted Seconda Divisione club Savona.

International career
He played at 1993 UEFA European Under-18 Football Championship qualification.

Honours
Serie C1: 2003

References

External links
 Profile at Alessandria (2009-10)  
 Profile at AIC.Football.it 
 Profile at La Gazzetta dello Sport (2006-07) 
 Profile at FIGC 

1975 births
Living people
People from Carmagnola
Italian footballers
Torino F.C. players
A.S. Gualdo Casacastalda players
Calcio Foggia 1920 players
Reggina 1914 players
A.C. Monza players
Calcio Lecco 1912 players
U.S. Catanzaro 1929 players
U.S. Triestina Calcio 1918 players
S.S.D. Lucchese 1905 players
U.S. Alessandria Calcio 1912 players
Savona F.B.C. players
Serie A players
Serie B players
Association football midfielders
Footballers from Piedmont
Sportspeople from the Metropolitan City of Turin